Buchanan Township is a township in Sullivan County, in the U.S. state of Missouri.

Buchanan Township was erected in 1872, taking its name James Buchanan, 15th President of the United States.

References

Townships in Missouri
Townships in Sullivan County, Missouri
Populated places disestablished in 2016